Oleksandr Hryhorovych Shevchenko (born 24 October 1992) is a Ukrainian professional footballer who plays as a centre-back.

Career
Shevchenko isn't a product of the any youth sportive school and joined professional football only in July 2015, when signed a contract with FC Enerhiya Nova Kakhovka in the Ukrainian Second League.

References

External links
 
 
 

1992 births
Living people
Footballers from Kyiv
Ukrainian footballers
Association football defenders
FC Bucha players
FC Enerhiya Nova Kakhovka players
FC Arsenal Kyiv players
SC Tavriya Simferopol players
FC Olimpik Donetsk players
Ukrainian First League players
Ukrainian Second League players